Neural machine translation (NMT) is an approach to machine translation that uses an artificial neural network to predict the likelihood of a sequence of words, typically modeling entire sentences in a single integrated model.

Properties
They require only a fraction of the memory needed by traditional statistical machine translation (SMT) models. Furthermore, unlike conventional translation systems, all parts of the neural translation model are trained jointly (end-to-end) to maximize the translation performance.

History
Deep learning applications appeared first in speech recognition in the 1990s. The first scientific paper on using neural networks in machine translation appeared in 2014. This year Bahdanau et al. and Sutskever
et al.proposed end-to-end neural network translation models and formally used the term "neural machine translation". First large-scale NMT system was launched by Baidu in 2015. Next year Google launched an NMT system too, followed by others. It was followed by a lot of advances in the following few years. (Large-vocabulary NMT, application to Image captioning, Subword-NMT, Multilingual NMT, Multi-Source NMT, Character-dec NMT, Zero-Resource NMT, Google, Fully Character-NMT, Zero-Shot NMT in 2017) In 2015 there was the first appearance of a NMT system in a public machine translation competition (OpenMT'15). WMT'15 also for the first time had a NMT contender; the following year it already had 90% of NMT systems among its winners.

Since 2017, neural machine translation has been used by the European Patent Office to make information from the global patent system instantly accessible. The system, developed in collaboration with Google, is paired with 31 languages, and as of 2018, the system has translated over nine million documents.

Workings
NMT departs from phrase-based statistical approaches that use separately engineered subcomponents. Neural machine translation (NMT) is not a drastic step beyond what has been traditionally done in statistical machine translation (SMT). Its main departure is the use of vector representations ("embeddings", "continuous space representations") for words and internal states. The structure of the models is simpler than phrase-based models. There is no separate language model, translation model, and reordering model, but just a single sequence model that predicts one word at a time. However, this sequence prediction is conditioned on the entire source sentence and the entire already produced target sequence.
NMT models use deep learning and representation learning.

The word sequence modeling was at first typically done using a recurrent neural network (RNN).
A bidirectional recurrent neural network, known as an encoder, is used by the neural network to encode a source sentence for a second RNN, known as a decoder, that is used to predict words in the target language. Recurrent neural networks face difficulties in encoding long inputs into a single vector. This can be compensated by an attention mechanism which allows the decoder to focus on different parts of the input while generating each word of the output. There are further Coverage Models addressing the issues in such attention mechanisms, such as ignoring of past alignment information leading to over-translation and under-translation.

Convolutional Neural Networks (Convnets) are in principle somewhat better for long continuous sequences, but were initially not used due to several weaknesses. These were successfully compensated for in 2017 by using "attention mechanisms".

The Transformer an attention-based model, remains the dominant architecture for several language pairs. The self-attention layers of the Transformer model learn the dependencies between words in a sequence by examining links between all the words in the paired sequences and by directly modeling those relationships.  It's a simpler approach than the gating mechanism that RNNs employ.  And its simplicity has enabled researchers to develop high-quality translation models with the Transformer model, even in low-resource settings.

Remarks

References

Applications of artificial intelligence
Computational linguistics
Machine translation
Tasks of natural language processing